The Face Thailand season 1 premiered on 4 October 2014 and ended on 10 January 2015. Lukkade Metinee, Ploy Chermarn and Ying Ratha served as model coaches and Utt Asda served as a host for the first season.

The winner of the competition was Ajirapha "Sabina" Meisinger.

Contestants
(ages stated are at start of filming)

Episodes

Episode 1 : Casting 
First aired 4 October 2014

In the first week is to qualify for all 30 people to shoot and the next natural makeup to steer his team to three Mentor, it was decided by a shoot . The second round comes to makeup for the Mentor team selection and finalists 15 people. 
Team Lukkade : Park, Hmei, May, Tarn, Sabina.
Team Ploy : Carisa, Penny, Jenny, Jigsaw, Ann.
Team Ying : Sai, Mila, Hong, Belle, Pompam.

Episode 2 : Private Fashion Show 
First aired 11 October 2014

 Winning coach and team: Ying Rhatha
 Bottom two: Park Jirajitmeechai & Jiksor Ubonratsamee
 Eliminated: Jiksor Ubonratsamee

Episode 3 : Tribe Style Costumes 
First aired 18 October 2014

 Winning coach and team: Lukkade Metinee
 Bottom two: Pompam Rueangsilprasert & Penny Lane
 Eliminated: Pompam Rueangsilprasert

Episode 4 : Bounce Fashion Photoshoot 
First aired 1 November 2014

 Winning coach and team: Lukkade Metinee
 Bottom two: Jenny Akrasaevaya & Hong Sirimat
 Eliminated: Jenny Akrasaevaya

Episode 5 : Into The Forest 
First aired 8 November 2014

 Winning coach and team: Ploy Chermarn
 Bottom two: Mei Rienrukwong & Hong Sirimat
 Eliminated: Mei Rienrukwong

Episode 6 : Sporty Photoshoot 
First aired 15 November 2014

 Winning coach and team: Ying Rhatha
 Bottom two: Ann Porsild & Park Jirajitmeechai
 Eliminated: Park Jirajitmeechai
 Special guest: Kan Kantathavorn

Episode 7 : Runway on Dinning Table 
First aired 29 November 2014

 Winning coach and team: Lukkade Metinee
 Bottom two: Ann Porsild & Belle Saibuapan
 Eliminated: Ann Porsild
 Special guest: Puttichai Kasetsin

Episode 8 : Girls Night Out 
First aired 6 December 2014

 Winning coach and team: Ploy Chermarn
 Bottom two: Sabina Meisinger & Hong Sirimat
 Eliminated: Hong Sirimat

Episode 9 : Triple New York Look 
First aired 13 December 2014

 Winning coach and team: Ploy Chermarn
 Bottom two: Belle Saibuapan & Tarn Kunpiyawat
 Eliminated: Tarn Kunpiyawat
 Special mentor: Namthip Jongrachatawiboon

Episode 10 : Flying Pose 
First aired 20 December 2014

 Winning coach and team: Lukkade Metinee
 Bottom two: Penny Lane & Mila Poomdit
 Eliminated: None

Episode 11 : Color Sensational 
First aired 27 December 2014

 Winning coach and team: Ying Rhatha
 Winning campaign: Mila Poomdit
 Final three was chosen by Coach : Sabina Meisinger, Sai Visuttipranee & Penny Lane
 Fourth final was chosen by coach from winning campaign team: Mila Poomdit
 Eliminated: Carissa Springett, Belle Saibuapan & May Thanamethpiya

Episode 12 : Top 4 
First aired 3 January 2015

In this week's episode recap the final four contestants to talk about the last race.

Episode 13 : Final Walk 
First aired 10 January 2015

 Final four: Sai Visuttipranee, Mila Poomdit, Sabina Meisinger & Penny Lane
 Winning campaign: Penny Lane
 Eliminated: Sai Visuttipranee
 Final three: Mila Poomdit, Penny Lane & Sabina Meisinger
 The Face Thailand: Sabina Meisinger

Summaries

Elimination Table

 The contestant was part of the winning team for the episode.
 The contestant was at risk of elimination.
 The contestant was eliminated from the competition.
 The contestant won the campaign individually.
 The contestant was a Runner-Up.
 The contestant won The Face.

 Episode 1 was the casting episode. The final fifteen were divided into individual teams of five as they were selected.
 In episode 9, Namthip Jongrachatawiboon replaced Ploy who was occupied by her event, but after the campaign, Ploy was back to the elimination process as Team Ploy's mentor.
 In episode 10, team Lukkade won the campaign. Ying nominated Mila while Ploy nominated Penny for elimination. Lukkade told both of the girls that they should not have been in the room because they were not the worst. Furthermore, she thought that there was an unfair nomination from one of the teams. Lukkade left the elimination without making her decision. The previews for episode 11, showed Lukkade talking with both of the mentors about their nominations. The fate of both of the nominated contestant remained unknown, as the episode ended in a cliffhanger.
 In episode 11, Mila won the campaign individually, automatically let team Ying choose another contestant. Lukkade, Ploy, and Ying were allowed to choose any one contestant to advance into the finale from the remaining seven models. Lukkade chose Sabina, Ploy chose Penny, and Ying chose Sai. After know team Ying won a campaign. Ying choose Mila as a final contestant who allow to a final runway. May, Carissa and Belle was eliminated.
 In episode 12, was the recap the final four contestants to talk about the last race.
 In episode 13, Penny won the campaign individually, Sabina, Penny and Mila were put through to the final runway show while Sai was eliminated.

Campaigns
 Episode 1: Natural Beauty Shots; Self Administered 'Transformations' (Casting)
 Episode 2: Private Fashion Show Modeling Accessories
 Episode 3: Photoshoot "Exotic Tribal Wear"
 Episode 4: Photoshoot Jumping on a Trampoline
 Episode 5: Fashion walking "Queen of the jungle"
 Episode 6: Photoshoot "Soccer for AIS" with male models
 Episode 7: Obstacle Catwalk for The Charity
 Episode 8: Short film "Girls Night Out Commercial" for MG 3
 Episode 9: Commercial for Maybelline
 Episode 10: Flying Pose for Samsung Gear S
 Episode 11: Maybelline Exclusive Look: Colcor Sensational Commercial for Maybelline
 Episode 13: Acting and Finalwalk

References 

Thailand, 1
The Face Thailand seasons
2014 Thai television seasons
2015 Thai television seasons